The Syrian Democratic Council (MSD;) is the political wing of the Syrian Democratic Forces in the Autonomous Administration of North and East Syria (AANES). The SDC's stated mission is working towards the implementation of a "Pluralistic, democratic and decentralized system for all of Syria".

Establishment and history

2015

The Syrian Democratic Council was established on 10 December 2015 in Al-Malikiyah. Prominent human rights activist Haytham Manna was elected co-chair at its founding.

The Assembly that established the Syrian Democratic Council was made up of 13 members from specific ethnic, economic and political backgrounds.

2016
On 1 August 2016 the Syrian Democratic Council opened a public office in Hasakah.

On 11 September 2016 the Syria's Tomorrow Movement signed a cooperation agreement with the Syrian Democratic Council and the associated de facto autonomous region of the AANES.

In late September and early October 2016 a forum for the Syrian Democratic Council was held in the town of Rmelan, in the northeastern Hasakah Governorate. Those that attended the conference included a representative from Jableh, in the western Latakia Governorate.

2017
On 13 January 2017, a youth constituent assembly was established in Qamishli.

On 25 February 2017, the Assyrian Democratic Party agreed to join the Syrian Democratic Council, and the YPG agreed to hand over security in the Assyrian towns along the Khabur River to the Khabour Guards and Nattoreh which joined the Syrian Democratic Forces. On 13 April, PYD forces officially handed over the Khabur valley's villages to the Khabour Guards and Nattoreh, though the YPG kept a military base near Tell Tamer. On the same day, the second conference of the SDC took place in al-Malikiyah and Riad Darar was elected as the co-president of the SDC, replacing Haytham Manna, alongside Îlham Ehmed, who was re-elected.

On 28 May 2017, a female branch of the Syrian Democratic Assembly was established in Al-Shaddadah.

2018
Elections for the council were planned for early 2018, but never held. On 16 July 2018, the Third Conference of SDC was held under the slogan "Towards a Political Solution and Building a Decentralized Democratic Syria" in Al-Tabqa city, where the delegates elected Amina Omar and re-elected Riad Darar as co-chairs of SDC. Amina Omar replaced Îlham Ehmed, who was elected co-president of the Executive Council of the AANES,

On 6 September 2018, SDC held a meeting of local councils and autonomous administration departments in north and east Syria at the headquarters of SDC in Ain Issa town, with the participation of Amina Omar, co-chair of SDC, the heads of the civil councils in North Syria and the dignitaries of the Arab tribes, to form an autonomous administration of north and east of Syria on the basis of the decision taken at the third conference of the SDC held on 16 July this year. During the meeting, the 70-member General Council for Autonomous Administration of North, East Syria was formed as follows: 49 members of the legislative councils in the areas of Autonomous Administration and civil councils, and 21 members of the technocrats agreed upon through the preparatory committee and discuss other departments. Mrs. Siham Qariou (Syriac) and Mr. Farid Atti (Kurd) were elected to the joint presidency of the General Council for the Autonomous Administration of North and East Syria, also were elected five members of General Office of the council. Mrs. Berivan Khaled (Khalid) and Abdul Hamid al-Mahbash were elected co-chairmen of Executive Body.
Later, in the meeting held on 3 October 2018, the co-chairs of the nine Authorities of the Executive Council were elected.
On October 21, the first meeting of the General Council was held, at which a legal committee of three people was created, whose tasks is to determine laws, concepts and proposals from committees, departments and offices, in addition to studying the laws issued by the council. At the meeting it was decided to hold meetings of the Council twice a month.

Involvement in negotiations on Syria

The Syrian Democratic Council was invited to participate in the international Geneva III peace talks on Syria in March 2016. However, it rejected the invitations because no representatives of the Movement for a Democratic Society, led by the Democratic Union Party, were invited.

Effective 31 January 2018, the SDC is registered in the US as a "foreign political party" under the Foreign Agents Registration Act.

Members of the General Federal Assembly

References

2015 establishments in Syria
2015 in the Autonomous Administration of North and East Syria
2015 in the Syrian civil war
Organizations of the Syrian civil war
Political party alliances in Syria
Politics of the Autonomous Administration of North and East Syria
Syrian democracy movements
Syrian Democratic Forces